The 1917 Alberta general election was held on 7 June 1917 to elect members of the Legislative Assembly of Alberta. The Liberals won a fourth term in office, defeating the Conservative Party of Edward Michener. 

Because of World War I, eleven Members of the Legislative Assembly (MLAs) were re-elected by acclamation, under Section 38 of the Election Act, which stipulated that any member of the 3rd Alberta Legislative Assembly, would be guaranteed re-election, with no contest held, if members joined for war time service. Eleven MLAs were automatically re-elected through this clause. (None were re-elected in the next election.)

In addition, soldiers and nurses from Alberta serving in the First World War elected two MLAs. Two extra seats were thus added just for this election. The MLAs were non-partisan officially. But both Robert Pearson and Roberta MacAdams allied themselves to Labour and Non-Partisan League MLAs by showing social consciousness in regards the conditions available for returned soldiers and working families. These two members were elected in one contest, while each other MLA was elected through first past the post in a single-member district.

In 1917, the main issue facing the nation was conscription. In Alberta, where support for conscription was high, the incumbent Liberal government of Arthur Sifton decided to break with federal Liberal leader Wilfrid Laurier and support Conservative Prime Minister Robert Borden's efforts to form a coalition government.  The two major parties both supported conscription, but growing labour and farmer activism, and the entry of women into politics, both as voters and candidates, made the election exciting enough that 30,000 more votes were cast than in the previous election (although they were nothing like the high numbers that would be cast in the 1921 election).

This was the last time Liberals won an Alberta provincial election. The 1917 election was the tightest majority ever formed in Alberta history, with the combined opposition equaling 41% of the MLAs on the government benches. Premier Sifton resigned in October 1917 in order to serve in the federal Unionist government of Prime Minister Borden and was replaced by Charles Stewart.

This was the first election in Alberta that women (those who were British subjects or Canadian citizens more than 20 years of age who were not Treaty Indian) had the right to vote and run. Two women were elected in the legislature that year. One of these was Roberta MacAdams, elected as one of two representatives of soldiers and nurses serving in the war. The other, Louise McKinney, was elected as a candidate of the Non-Partisan League. Her election and the election of fellow NPL candidate James Weir were harbingers of the rise of farmer politics that would see the election of the UFA government in 1921.

The Alberta Labor Representation League, which opposed conscription, elected one member in Calgary, Alex Ross.

The vote in the Athabasca district was conducted on 27 June 1917 due to the remoteness of the riding.

Electoral system
All but two of the MLAs elected in this election were elected through first past the post. Alberta had used multiple-member districts in Edmonton and Calgary previously, but for this election they had been split into single-member districts.

The two overseas army members were elected through plurality block voting.

Results

Notes

Members of the Legislative Assembly
For complete electoral history, see individual districts

|-
|Acadia
||
|John A. McColl1,84248.22%
|
|E. Gordon Jonah1,22932.17%
|
|Lorne Proudfoot74919.61%
||
|John A. McColl
|-
|Alexandra
|
|
||
|James R. LoweryAcclaimed
|
|
||
|James R. Lowery
|-
|Athabasca
||
|Alexander Grant MacKay75265.79%
|
|Alfred F. Fugl39134.21%
|
|
||
|Alexander Grant MacKay
|-
|Beaver River
||
|Wilfrid Gariepy1,13464.07%
|
|Ambrose E. Gray63635.93%
|
|
||
|Wilfrid Gariepy
|-
|Bow Valley
||
|Charles Richmond Mitchell60458.13%
|
|Edmund F. Purcell43541.87%
|
|
||
|George Lane
|-
|Centre Calgary
|
|
|
|Thomas M.M. Tweedie1,27348.94%
||
|Alex Ross1,32851.06%
||
|Thomas M.M. Tweedie
|-
|North Calgary
||
|William McCartney Davidson2,70154.72%
|
|Samuel Bacon Hillocks2,23545.28%
|
|
||
|Samuel Bacon Hillocks
|-
|South Calgary
|
|
||
|Thomas H. Blow3,27348.01%
|
|William Irvine (Labour-Rep.)2,24832.98%John McNeill1,29619.01%
||
|Thomas H. Blow
|-
|Camrose
||
|George P. Smith2,25865.22%
|
|Frank P. Layton1,20434.78%
|
|
||
|George P. Smith
|-
|Cardston
||
|Martin Woolf97256.38%
|
|W.G. Smith75243.62%
|
|
||
|Martin Woolf
|-
|Claresholm
|
|William Moffat67044.40%
|
|
||
|Louise McKinney83955.60%
||
|William Moffat
|-
|Clearwater
||
|Joseph E. State18864.38%
|
|Robert Neville Frith10435.62%
|
|
||
|Henry William McKenney
|-
|Cochrane
||
|Charles Wellington Fisher63057.32%
|
|H.E.G.H. Scholefield46942.68%
|
|
||
|Charles Wellington Fisher
|-
|Coronation
|
|Harry S. Northwood1,57546.92%
||
|William Wallace Wilson1,78253.08%
|
|
||
|Frank H. Whiteside
|-
|Didsbury
||
|Henry B. Atkins1,39452.80%
|
|Wilbur Leslie Tolton1,24647.20%
|
|
||
|Joseph E. Stauffer
|-
|Edmonton East
|
|Fredrick Duncan2,55337.86%
||
|James Ramsey3,03545.00%
|
|Joseph A. Clarke81112.03%Sydney R. Keeling (Socialist)3455.12%
|
|New District from Edmonton
|-
|Edmonton-South
|
|Robert Blyth Douglas2,17844.10%
||
|Herbert Howard Crawford2,76155.90%
|
|
||
|Herbert Howard Crawford
|-
|Edmonton West
|
|William Thomas Henry2,88443.30%
||
|Albert Freeman Ewing3,77656.70%
|
|
|
|New District from Edmonton
|-
|Edson
||
|Charles Wilson Cross1,11662.91%
|
|J.R. McIntosh45525.65%
|
|John Reid (Socialist)20311.44%
||
|Charles Wilson Cross
|-
|Gleichen
|
|John P. McArthur71239.96%
||
|Fred Davis76242.76%
|
|John W. Leedy30817.28%
||
|John P. McArthur
|-
|Grouard
||
|Jean Léon Côté68870.71%
|
|Eugene Gravel28529.29%
|
|
||
|Jean Léon Côté
|-
|Hand Hills
||
|Robert Berry EatonAcclaimed
|
|
|
|
||
|Robert Berry Eaton
|-
|High River
|
|Dan F. Riley88548.95%
||
|George Douglas Stanley92351.05%
|
|
||
|George Douglas Stanley
|-
|Innisfail
||
|Daniel J. Morkeberg90551.33%
|
|Frederick William Archer76643.45%
|
|James K. Wilson925.22%
||
|Frederick William Archer
|-
|Lac Ste. Anne
|
|Ralph E. Barker76648.91%
||
|George R. Barker80051.09%
|
|
||
|Peter Gunn
|-
|Lacombe
|
|William Franklin Puffer1,33348.37%
||
|Andrew Gilmour1,42351.63%
|
|
||
|William Franklin Puffer
|-
|Leduc
||
|Stanley G. Tobin1,70773.67%
|
|George Currie61026.33%
|
|
||
|Stanley G. Tobin
|-
|Lethbridge City
|
|
||
|John S. StewartAcclaimed
|
|
||
|John S. Stewart
|-
|Little Bow
||
|James McNaughton80877.39%
|
|
|
|
||
|James McNaughton
|-
|Macleod
||
|George Skelding72851.78%
|
|Robert Patterson67848.22%
|
|
||
|Robert Patterson
|-
|Medicine Hat
|
|
||
|Nelson C. SpencerAcclaimed
|
|
||
|Nelson C. Spencer
|-
|Nanton
|
|John M. Glendenning41532.88%
|
|J.T. Cooper40832.33%
||
|James Weir43934.79%
||
|John M. Glendenning
|-
|Okotoks
|
|Angus McIntosh53540.50%
||
|George Hoadley78659.50%
|
|
||
|George Hoadley
|-
|Olds
||
|Duncan Marshall1,28356.35%
|
|George H. Cloakey99443.65%
|
|
||
|Duncan Marshall
|-
|Peace River
||
|William A. Rae1,99462.92%
|
|D.H. Minchin71222.47%
|
|L. Harry Adair46314.61%
||
|Alphaeus Patterson
|-
|Pembina
||
|Gordon MacDonaldAcclaimed
|
|
|
|
||
|Gordon MacDonald
|-
|Pincher Creek
|
|Thomas Hammond44832.94%
||
|John H.W.S. Kemmis49636.47%
|
|J. E. Hillier (Non-partisan)41630.59%
||
|John H.W.S. Kemmis
|-
|Ponoka
|
|William A. Campbell85749.11%
||
|Charles Orin Cunningham88850.89%
|
|
||
|William A. Campbell
|-
|Red Deer
|
|Robert B. Welliver1,27244.87%
||
|Edward Michener1,29545.68%
|
|George Paton2689.45%
||
|Edward Michener
|-
|Redcliff
||
|Charles S. PingleAcclaimed
|
|
|
|
||
|Charles S. Pingle
|-
|Ribstone
||
|James Gray TurgeonAcclaimed
|
|
|
|
||
|James Gray Turgeon
|-
|Rocky Mountain
|
|
||
|Robert E. CampbellAcclaimed
|
|
||
|Robert E. Campbell
|-
|Sedgewick
||
|Charles Stewart1,65763.05%
|
|John Reeve Lavell97136.95%
|
|
||
|Charles Stewart
|-
|St. Albert
||
|Lucien Boudreau1,09559.61%
|
|Hector L. Landry74240.39%
|
|
||
|Lucien Boudreau
|-
|St. Paul
||
|Prosper-Edmond Lessard1,07766.65%
|
|James Brady53933.35%
|
|
||
|Prosper-Edmond Lessard
|-
|Stettler
||
|Edward H. Prudden1,40839.45%
|
|George McMorris1,37538.53%
|
|J.R. Knight78622.02%
||
|Robert L. Shaw
|-
|Stony Plain
|
|Frank A. Smith70548.65%
||
|Frederick W. Lundy74451.35%
|
|
||
|Conrad Weidenhammer
|-
|Sturgeon
||
|John Robert Boyle1,54647.19%
|
|James Sutherland1,21237.00%
|
|H. Mickleson51815.81%
||
|John Robert Boyle
|-
|Taber
||
|Archibald J. McLean1,80463.75%
|
|Thomas O. King1,02636.25%
|
|
||
|Archibald J. McLean
|-
|Vegreville
||
|Joseph S. McCallum1,86459.12%
|
|Malcolm R. Gordon1,28940.88%
|
|
||
|Joseph S. McCallum
|-
|Vermilion
||
|Arthur L. Sifton2,06363.03%
|
|John B. Burch1,21036.97%
|
|
||
|Arthur L. Sifton
|-
|Victoria
||
|Francis A. WalkerAcclaimed
|
|
|
|
||
|Francis A. Walker
|-
|Wainwright
|
|
||
|George LeRoy HudsonAcclaimed
|
|
||
|George LeRoy Hudson
|-
|Warner
||
|Frank S. Leffingwell70664.89%
|
|Hy. James Tennant38235.11%
|
|
||
|Frank S. Leffingwell
|-
|Wetaskiwin
||
|Hugh John Montgomery1,50068.71%
|
|Robert MacLachlan Angus68331.29%
|
|
||
|Charles H. Olin
|-
|Whitford
||
|Andrew S. ShandroAcclaimed
|
|
|
|
||
|Andrew S. Shandro
|-
|}

Members acclaimed under Section 38
Eleven Liberal and Conservative MLAs serving in the army were allowed to retain their seats without election.

1917 soldiers' and nurses' vote
Two extra seats were added for this election. Two MLAs were elected to represent the soldiers and nurses serving overseas. They were elected through plurality block voting, with each soldier and nurse having two votes. Roberta MacAdams, the sole woman in the race, capitalized on the two-vote system by instructing the soldiers to "give one vote to the man of your choice and the other vote to the Sister" (herself). She was successful, becoming the second woman elected in Alberta and in the whole of the British Empire.

Candidates and voters were Albertans who were enlisted for overseas military, naval or nursing service. The MLAs sat on the opposition benches. They were non-partisan officially, although both Robert Pearson and Roberta MacAdams allied themselves to Labour and NPL MLAs by showing social consciousness in regards the conditions available for returned soldiers and working families.

The vote was held on 18 September 1917.

See also
List of Alberta political parties

References

Further reading
 

1917 elections in Canada
1917
1917 in Alberta
July 1917 events